Egypt competed at the 2019 World Athletics Championships in Doha, Qatar, from 27 September to 6 October 2019. Egypt will send only one athlete.

Results
(q – qualified, NM – no mark, SB – season best)

Men
Track and road events

Field events

Women
Track and road events

References

External links
Doha｜WCH 19｜World Athletics

Nations at the 2019 World Athletics Championships
World Championships in Athletics
Egypt at the World Championships in Athletics